Rotterdam (lit. "The Dam on the River Rotte") is the second largest city and municipality in the Netherlands. It is in the province of South Holland, part of the North Sea mouth of the Rhine–Meuse–Scheldt delta, via the "New Meuse" inland shipping channel, dug to connect to the Meuse first, but now to the Rhine instead.

Rotterdam's history goes back to 1270, when a dam was constructed in the Rotte. In 1340, Rotterdam was granted city rights by William IV, Count of Holland. The Rotterdam–The Hague metropolitan area, with a population of approximately 2.7 million, is the 10th-largest in the European Union and the most populous in the country.

A major logistic and economic centre, Rotterdam is Europe's largest seaport. In 2022, it had a population of 655,468 and is home to over 180 nationalities.  Rotterdam is known for its university, riverside setting, lively cultural life, maritime heritage and modern architecture. The near-complete destruction of the city centre in the World War II Rotterdam Blitz has resulted in a varied architectural landscape, including skyscrapers designed by architects such as Rem Koolhaas, Piet Blom and Ben van Berkel.

The Rhine, Meuse and Scheldt give waterway access into the heart of Western Europe, including the highly industrialized Ruhr. The extensive distribution system including rail, roads, and waterways have earned Rotterdam the nicknames "Gateway to Europe" and "Gateway to the World".

History

Early history

The settlement at the lower end of the fen stream Rotte (or Rotta, as it was then known, from rot, "muddy" and a, "water", thus "muddy water") dates from at least 950 CE. Around 1150, large floods in the area ended development, leading to the construction of protective dikes and dams, including Schielands Hoge Zeedijk ("Schieland's High Sea Dike") along the northern banks of the present-day Nieuwe Maas river. A dam on the Rotte was built in the 1260s and was located at the present-day Hoogstraat ("High Street").

On 7 July 1340, Count Willem IV of Holland granted city rights to Rotterdam, whose population then was only a few thousand. Around the year 1350, a shipping canal (the Rotterdamse Schie) was completed, which provided Rotterdam access to the larger towns in the north, allowing it to become a local trans-shipment centre between the Netherlands, England and Germany, and to urbanize.

The port of Rotterdam grew slowly but steadily into a port of importance, becoming the seat of one of the six "chambers" of the Vereenigde Oostindische Compagnie (VOC), the Dutch East India Company and one of the five "chambers" of the  West-Indische Compagnie (WIC), the Dutch West India Company.

The greatest spurt of growth, both in port activity and population, followed the completion of the Nieuwe Waterweg in 1872. The city and harbour started to expand on the south bank of the river. The Witte Huis or White House skyscraper, inspired by American office buildings and built in 1898 in the French Art Nouveau style, is evidence of Rotterdam's rapid growth and success.

20th century

During World War I, the city was the world's largest spy centre because of Dutch neutrality and its strategic location between Britain, Germany and German-occupied Belgium. Many spies who were arrested and executed in Britain were led by German secret agents operating from Rotterdam. MI6 had its main European office on de Boompjes. From there the British coordinated espionage in Germany and occupied Belgium. During World War I, an average of 25,000 Belgian refugees lived in the city, as well as hundreds of German deserters and escaped Allied prisoners of war.

During World War II, the German army invaded the Netherlands on 10 May 1940. Adolf Hitler had hoped to conquer the country in just one day, but his forces met unexpectedly fierce resistance. The Dutch army was forced to capitulate on 15 May 1940, following the bombing of Rotterdam on 14 May and the threat of bombing other Dutch cities. The heart of Rotterdam was almost completely destroyed by the Luftwaffe. Some 80,000 civilians were made homeless and 900 were killed; a relatively low number since many had fled the city because of the warfare and bombing going on in Rotterdam since the start of the invasion three days earlier. The City Hall survived the bombing. Ossip Zadkine later attempted to capture the event with his statue De Verwoeste Stad ('The Destroyed City'). The statue stands near the Leuvehaven, not far from the Erasmusbrug in the centre of the city, on the north shore of the river Nieuwe Maas. In 1941, 11,000 Jews still lived in Rotterdam. Before the war there were 13,000. Between 30 July 1942, and 22 April 1943, 6,790 people were deported in 8 transports via Loods 24. The vast majority of the Jews who were deported via Loods 24 were murdered in Sobibór and Auschwitz-Birkenau. Research in 2000 showed that 144 people survived the deportations. In 2013 the Jewish Children's Monument was unveiled.

In January 1948, Queen Wilhelmina presented the motto 'Sterker door strijd' (Stronger through effort) as part of the coat of arms of Rotterdam to the city government:

...as a reminder also for posterity of the courage and strength with which the people of Rotterdam bore all the trials of the war and the important part they took in the liberation of the fatherland....
—Wilhelmina of the Netherlands

Rotterdam was gradually rebuilt from the 1950s through to the 1970s. Because the city centre was largely destroyed, new spatial infrastructure could be built, making it an open and modern city. In 1953 the Lijnbaan was opened, the first car-free shopping street in Europe. The progressive design attracted a lot of international attention. The new Central Station was completed in 1957, with the Groothandelsgebouw from 1953 next to it. The Euromast was erected in 1960 on the occasion of the Floriade.
From the 1980s onwards the city councils began developing an active architectural policy. The harbours were moving westwards and the old environment had to be reshaped. Daring and new styles of apartments, office buildings and recreation facilities resulted in a more 'livable' city centre with a new skyline. In the 1990s, the Kop van Zuid was built on the south bank of the river as a new business centre. Rotterdam was voted 2015 European City of the Year by the Academy of Urbanism. A profile of Rem Koolhaas in The Guardian begins "If you put the last 50 years of architecture in a blender, and spat it out in building-sized chunks across the skyline, you would probably end up with something that looked a bit like Rotterdam."

Geography

Rotterdam is divided into a northern and a southern part by the river Nieuwe Maas, connected by (from west to east): the Beneluxtunnel; the Maastunnel; the Erasmusbrug; a subway tunnel; the Willemsspoortunnel ('Willems railway tunnel'); the Willemsbrug ('Willems Bridge') together with the Koninginnebrug ('Queen's Bridge'); and the Van Brienenoordbrug ('Van Brienenoord Bridge'). The former railway lift bridge De Hef ('the Lift') is preserved as a Rijksmonument (national heritage site) in lifted position between the Noordereiland ('North Island') and the south of Rotterdam.

The city centre is located on the northern bank of the Nieuwe Maas, although recent urban development has extended the centre to parts of southern Rotterdam known as Kop van Zuid ('the Head of South', i.e. the northern part of southern Rotterdam). From its inland core, Rotterdam reaches the North Sea by a swathe of predominantly harbour area.

Built mostly behind dikes, large parts of the Rotterdam are below sea level. The lowest point in the Netherlands ( below NAP) is situated just to the east of Rotterdam, in the municipality of Nieuwerkerk aan den IJssel.

The Rotte river no longer joins the Nieuwe Maas directly. Since the early 1980s, when the construction of Rotterdam's second subway line interfered with the Rotte's course, its waters have been pumped through a pipe into the Nieuwe Maas via the Boerengat. 

Between the summers of 2003 and 2008, an artificial beach was created at the Boompjeskade along the Nieuwe Maas, between the Erasmus Bridge and the Willems Bridge. Alternatively, people go to the beach of Hook of Holland (which is a Rotterdam district) or one of the beaches in Zeeland: Renesse or the Zuid Hollandse Eilanden: Ouddorp, Oostvoorne.

Rotterdam forms the centre of the Rijnmond conurbation, bordering the conurbation surrounding The Hague to the north-west. The two conurbations are close enough to be a single conurbation. They share the Rotterdam The Hague Airport and a light rail system called RandstadRail. Consideration is being given to creating an official Metropolitan region Rotterdam The Hague (Metropoolregio Rotterdam Den Haag), which would have a combined population approaching 2.5 million.

On its turn, the Rijnmond conurbation is part of the southern wing (the Zuidvleugel) of the Randstad, which is one of the most important economic and densely populated areas in the north-west of Europe. Having a population of 7.1 million, the Randstad is the sixth-largest urban area in Europe (after Moscow, London, Paris, Istanbul, and the Rhein-Ruhr Area). The Zuidvleugel, situated in the province of South Holland, has a population of around 3 million.

Climate
Rotterdam experiences a temperate oceanic climate (Köppen climate classification Cfb) similar to all of the coastal areas in the Netherlands. Located near to the coast, its climate is slightly milder than locations further inland. Winters are cool with frequent cold days, while the summers are mild to warm, with occasional hot temperatures. Temperature rises above 30 °C on average 4 days each summer, while (night) temperatures can drop below -5 °C during winter for short periods of time, mostly during periods of sustained easterly (continental) winds. Precipitation is generally moderate throughout the year, although spring and summer (particularly before August) are relatively drier and sunnier, while autumn and winter are cloudier with more frequent rain (or snow). The following climate data is from the airport, which is slightly cooler than the city, being surrounded by water canals which make the climate milder and with a higher relative humidity. The city has an urban heat island, especially inside the city centre.

Demographics

Rotterdam is diverse, with the demographics differing by neighbourhood. The city centre has a disproportionately high number of single people when compared to other cities, with 70% of the population between the ages of 20 and 40 identifying as single. Those with higher education and higher income live disproportionately in the city centre, as do foreign-born citizens. 54% of city centre residents are foreign-born, compared to 45% in other parts of the city, while in the city centre 70% of businesses are run by foreign-born people. Nonetheless, this is not a comment on income, as 80% of homes are rented in the city centre.

Composition

The municipality of Rotterdam is part of the Rotterdam-The Hague Metropolitan Area which, as of 2015, covers an area of 1,130 km2, of which 990 km km2 is land, and has a population of approximately 2,563,197. As of 2019, the municipality itself occupies an area of 325.79 km2, 208.80 km2 of which is land, and is home to 638,751 inhabitants. Its population peaked at 731,564 in 1965, but the dual processes of suburbanization and counterurbanization saw this number steadily decline over the next 2 decades, reaching 560,000 by 1985. Although Rotterdam has experienced population growth since then, it has done so at a slower pace than comparable cities in the Netherlands, like Amsterdam, The Hague and Utrecht.

Rotterdam consists of 14 submunicipalities: Centrum, Charlois (including Heijplaat), Delfshaven, Feijenoord, Hillegersberg-Schiebroek, Hook of Holland, Hoogvliet, IJsselmonde, Kralingen-Crooswijk, Noord, Overschie, Pernis, and Prins Alexander (the most populous submunicipality with around 85,000 inhabitants). One other area, Rozenburg, does have an official submunicipality status since 18 March 2010. Since the status of a submunicipality was lifted on 19 March 2014, it became an integral part of the municipality of Rotterdam .

The size of the municipality of Rotterdam is the result of the amalgamation of the following former municipalities, some of which were a submunicipality prior to 19 March 2014:

Delfshaven (added on 30 January 1886)
Charlois (added on 28 February 1895)
Kralingen (added on 28 February 1895)
Hoogvliet (added on 1 May 1934)
Pernis (added on 1 May 1934)
Hillegersberg (added on 1 August 1941)
IJsselmonde (added on 1 August 1941)
Overschie (added on 1 August 1941)
Schiebroek (added on 1 August 1941)
Rozenburg (added on 18 March 2010)

Ethnic makeup
In the Netherlands, Rotterdam has the highest percentage of foreigners from non-industrialised nations. They form a large part of Rotterdam's multi-ethnic and multicultural diversity. 52.9% of the population are of non-Dutch origins or have at least one parent born outside the country. There are 80,000 Muslims, constituting 13% of the population. The mayor of Rotterdam, Ahmed Aboutaleb, is of Moroccan descent and is a practicing Muslim (mayors are not elected in the Netherlands). The city is home to the largest Dutch Antillean community. The city also has its own China Town at the West-Kruiskade, close to Rotterdam Centraal.

Religion

Christianity is the largest religion in Rotterdam, with 36.3% of the population identifying. The second and third largest religions are Islam (13.1%) and Hinduism (3.3%), while about half of the population has no religious affiliation.

Since 1795 Rotterdam has hosted the chief congregation of the liberal Protestant brotherhood of Remonstrants. From 1955 it has been the seat of the Catholic bishop of Rotterdam when the Rotterdam diocese was split from the Haarlem diocese. Since 2010 the city is home to the largest mosque in the Netherlands, the Essalam mosque (capacity 1,500).

Politics
The municipal council consists of 45 members, the largest party is Livable Rotterdam. The municipal executive consists of mayor Ahmed Aboutaleb and nine elderman, belonging to four parties.

Economy

Rotterdam has always been one of the main centres of the shipping industry in the Netherlands. From the Rotterdam Chamber of the VOC, the world's first multinational, established in 1602, to the merchant shipping leader Royal Nedlloyd established in 1970, with its corporate headquarters located in the landmark building the 'Willemswerf' in 1988. In 1997, Nedlloyd merged with the British shipping industry leader P&O forming the third largest merchant shipping company in the world. The Anglo-Dutch P&O Nedlloyd was bought by the Danish giant corporation 'AP Moller Maersk' in 2005 and its Dutch operations are still headquartered in the 'Willemswerf'. Nowadays, well-known companies with headquarters in Rotterdam are consumer goods company Unilever (since 2020 London), asset management firm Robeco, energy company Eneco, dredging company Van Oord, oil company Royal Dutch Shell (since 2021 London), terminal operator Vopak, commodity trading company Vitol and architecture firm Office for Metropolitan Architecture.

It is also home to the regional headquarters of chemical company LyondellBasell, commodities trading company Glencore, pharmaceutical company Pfizer, logistics companies Stolt-Nielsen, electrical equipment company ABB and consumer goods company Procter & Gamble. Furthermore, Rotterdam has the Dutch headquarters of Allianz, Maersk, Petrobras, Samskip, Louis Dreyfus Group, Aon and MP Objects. The City of Rotterdam makes use of the services of semi-government companies Roteb (to take care of sanitation, waste management and assorted services) and the Port of Rotterdam Authority (to maintain the Port of Rotterdam). Both these companies were once municipal bodies; now they are autonomous entities, owned by the city.

Being the largest port and one of the largest cities of the country, Rotterdam attracts many people seeking jobs, especially in the cheap labour segment. The city's unemployment rate is 12%, almost twice the national average. Rotterdam is the largest port in Europe, with the rivers Maas and Rhine providing excellent access to the hinterland upstream reaching to Basel, Switzerland and into France. In 2004 Shanghai took over as the world's busiest container port. In 2006, Rotterdam was the world's seventh largest container port in terms of twenty-foot equivalent units (TEU) handled. The port's main activities are petrochemical industries and general cargo handling and transshipment. The harbour functions as an important transit point for bulk materials between the European continent and overseas. From Rotterdam, goods are transported by ship, river barge, train or road. In 2007, the Betuweroute, a new fast freight railway from Rotterdam to Germany, was completed.

Well-known streets in Rotterdam are the Lijnbaan (the first set of pedestrian streets of the country, opened in 1953), the Hoogstraat, the Coolsingel with the city hall, which was renovated between 2018 and 2021 giving cyclists and pedestrians more space, car traffic was reduced from 4 lanes (2 in each direction) to 2 lanes (1 in each direction). Another mainstreet is the Weena, which runs from the Central Station to the Hofplein (square). A modern shopping venue is the Beurstraverse ("Stock Exchange Traverse"), better known by its informal name 'Koopgoot' ('Buying/Shopping Gutter', after its subterranean position), which crosses the Coolsingel below street level). The Kruiskade is a more upscale shopping street, with retailers like Michael Kors, 7 For All Mankind, Calvin Klein, Hugo Boss, Tommy Hilfiger and the Dutch well-known men's clothier Oger. Another upscale shopping venue is a flagship store of department store De Bijenkorf. Located a little more to the east is the Markthal, with lots of small retailers inside. This hall is also one of Rotterdam's famous architectural landmarks. The main shopping venue in the south of Rotterdam is Zuidplein, which lies close to Rotterdam Ahoy, an accommodation centre for shows, exhibitions, sporting events, concerts and congresses. Another prominent shopping centre called Alexandrium lies in the east of Rotterdam. It includes a large kitchen and furniture centre.

Education

Rotterdam has one major university, the Erasmus University Rotterdam (EUR), named after one of the city's famous former inhabitants, Desiderius Erasmus. The Woudestein campus houses (among others) Rotterdam School of Management, Erasmus University. In Financial Times' 2005 rankings it placed 29th globally and 7th in Europe. In the 2009 rankings of Masters of Management, the school reached first place with the CEMS Master in Management and the tenth place with its RSM Master in Management. The university is also home to Europe's largest student association, STAR Study Association Rotterdam School of Management, Erasmus University and the world's largest student association, AIESEC, has its international office in the city.

The Willem de Kooning Academy Rotterdam's main art school, which is part of the Hogeschool Rotterdam. It is regarded as one of the most prestigious art schools in the Netherlands and the number 1 in Advertising and Copywriting. Part of the Willem de Kooning Academy is the Piet Zwart Institute for postgraduate studies and research in Fine Art, Media Design and Retail Design. The Piet Zwart Institute boasts a selective roster of emerging international artists.

The Hoboken campus of EUR houses the Dijkzigt (general) hospital, the Sophia Hospital (for children), Daniel den Hoed clinic (cancer institute) and the medical department of the university. They are known collectively as the Erasmus Medical Center. This center is ranked third in Europe by CSIC as a hospital, and is also ranked within top 50 universities of the world in the field of medicine (clinical, pre-clinical & health, 2017).

Three Hogescholen (Universities of applied sciences) exist in Rotterdam. These schools award their students a professional Bachelor's degree and postgraduate or Master's degree. The three Hogescholen are Hogeschool Rotterdam, Hogeschool Inholland and Codarts University for the Arts (Codarts hogeschool voor de kunsten), a vocational university that teaches music, dance and circus.

As there are many international and American schools scattered across Europe such as ASH (American International School of the Hague) Rotterdam also has its own international school by the name NAISR (Nord Anglia International School Rotterdam). At NAISR children receive a multicultural education in a culturally diverse community and it offers the International Baccalaureate (IB) Diploma Programme.

Unique to the city is the Shipping & Transport College which offers masters, bachelors and vocational diplomas on all levels.

Culture

Alongside Porto, Rotterdam was European Capital of Culture in 2001. The city has its own orchestra, the Rotterdam Philharmonic Orchestra, with its well-regarded young music director Lahav Shani which plays at a large congress and concert building called De Doelen. There are several theatres and cinemas, including Cinerama. The Ahoy complex in the south of the city is used for pop concerts, exhibitions, tennis tournaments and other activities. A major zoo called Diergaarde Blijdorp is situated on the northwest side of Rotterdam, complete with a walkthrough sea aquarium called the Oceanium.

Rotterdam features some urban architecture projects, nightlife, and many summer festivals celebrating the city's multicultural population and identity, such as the Caribbean-inspired "Summer Carnival", the Dance Parade, Rotterdam 666, the Metropolis pop festival and the World Port Days. In the years 2005–2011 the city struggled with venues for pop music.  Many of the venues suffered severe financial problems. This resulted in the disappearance of the major music venues Nighttown and WATT and smaller stages such as Waterfront, Exit, and Heidegger. The city has a few venues for pop music like Rotown, Poortgebouw and Annabel. The venue WORM focuses on experimental music and related subcultural music.

There are also the International Film Festival in January, the Poetry International Festival in June, the North Sea Jazz Festival in July, the Valery Gergiev Festival in September, September in Rotterdam and the World of the Witte de With. In June 1970, The Kralingen Music Festival (which featured Pink Floyd, Jefferson Airplane, The Byrds, Canned Heat, It's a Beautiful Day, and Santana) was held and filmed in Rotterdam.

There is a healthy competition with Amsterdam, which is often viewed as the cultural capital of the Netherlands. This rivalry is most common amongst the city's football supporters, Feyenoord (Rotterdam) and Ajax (Amsterdam). There is a saying: "Amsterdam to party, Den Haag (The Hague) to live, Rotterdam to work". Another one, more popular by Rotterdammers, is "Money is earned in Rotterdam, distributed in The Hague and spent in Amsterdam". Another saying that reflects both the rivalry between Rotterdam and Amsterdam is "Amsterdam has it, Rotterdam doesn't need it". Bright magazine editor Erwin van der Zande notes that this phrase is on T-shirts in Rotterdam.

In terms of alternative culture, Rotterdam had from the 1960s until the 2000s a thriving squatters movement which as well as housing thousands of people, occupied venues, social centres and so on. From this movement came clubs like Boogjes, Eksit, Nighttown, Vlerk and Waterfront. The Poortgebouw was squatted in the 1980s and quickly legalised.

Rotterdam is also the home of Gabber, a type of hardcore electronic music popular in the mid-1990s, with hard beats and samples. Groups like Neophyte and Rotterdam Terror Corps (RTC) started in Rotterdam, playing at clubs like Parkzicht.

On 30 August 2019, it was announced by the European Broadcasting Union and Dutch television broadcasters AVROTROS, NOS and NPO, that Rotterdam would host the Eurovision Song Contest 2020, following the Dutch victory at the  contest in Tel Aviv, Israel with the song "Arcade", performed by Duncan Laurence. However, due to the COVID-19 pandemic in Europe, the 2020 contest was cancelled, and Rotterdam was later retained as host of the  contest. The contest took place at the Rotterdam Ahoy, with the semi-finals taking place on 18 and 20 May 2021, and the final taking place on 22 May 2021. This was the first time that Rotterdam hosted the contest, and the first time that the Netherlands hosted the contest since , when it was held in The Hague.

Museums
Rotterdam has many museums. Well known museums are the Museum Boijmans Van Beuningen, Het Nieuwe Instituut, the Wereldmuseum, the Kunsthal, [[Kunstinstituut Melly
]] and the Maritime Museum Rotterdam. The Historical Museum Rotterdam has changed into Museum Rotterdam which aims to exhibit Rotterdam as a contemporary transnational city, and not a past city. Other museums include the tax & customs museum, the Netherlands Marine Corps Museum and the natural history museum.

Green parts of Rotterdam

A number of well-known parks in Rotterdam are:
 Arboretum Trompenburg in Kralingen. The park dates back to 1820, but it was only after it was opened to the public in 1958 that the park, which was managed by the (Van Hoey) Smith family for generations, gained wider attention. The park, approximately 20 acres in size, contains approximately 4,000 different types of trees, shrubs and perennials, amongst others the national plant collections of conifers, Quercus, Fagus, Rhododendron, Ligustrum, Rodgersia and Hosta.
 The Park (70 acres) on the Maas south of the Westzeedijk at the Euromast. The eastern half was constructed between 1852 and 1863 to a design by the firm Jan David Zocher. The western part was added in 1866 with some modifications. The first Floriade in 1960 was held in Het Park with the Euromast observation tower being erected to mark the event. National Heritage site since 2011.
 Park Schoonoord (3 acres) is located in the Scheepvaartkwartier and was designed in its current form in 1860 by Jan David Zocher.
 The Kralingse Bos (500 acres) with the Kralingse Plas (250 acres) is located in the Kralingen district and has been based on a design by Marinus Jan Granpré Molière since 1928. In 1953 the Kralingse Bos is finally officially opened.
 The Vroesenpark in the district Rotterdam-Noord was laid out from 1929 to a plan by city architect W.G. Witteveen.
 The Zuiderpark (780 acres) is located in the district of Charlois. The park was laid out as a utility park from 1952 and not as an ornamental park.

Since 28 May 1994, Rotterdam has had the phenomenon Opzoomeren. 15% of Rotterdam residents (about 100,000 residents) say they participate in this phenomenon. At the end of 2020, the city has a record number of 2,503 Opzoomer streets, which is mainly reflected in the construction of facade gardens.

The municipality of Rotterdam is encouraging the construction of green roofs. There is an attractive subsidy for roof owners and the city has now provided a number of municipal buildings with a green roof. As of January 1, 2020, the water storage capacity requirement has been increased to 30 liters of water storage capacity per square metre. This reduces the burden on the sewer system during heavy rainfall and reduces the risk of flooding on the street.
 The city's largest green roof is located on top of the Groothandelsgebouw next to Central Station.
 The Dakakker is the largest roof farm in Europe on top of the Schieblok.
 The Dakpark is an elongated, narrow park in the district Bospolder-Tussendijken in Rotterdam-West. It has been built at a height of about nine meters, is about 85 meters wide and extends for about a kilometer from Hudson Square to near Marconi Square.
 The municipality of Rotterdam will provide the flat roof of the conference and concert building De Doelen with greenery and water storage. The design for the roof was made by Kraijvanger Architects.

Architecture

Rotterdam has become world famous because of its modern and groundbreaking architecture. Throughout the years the city has been nicknamed Manhattan at the Meuse and The architectural capital of the Netherlands both for its skyline and because it is home to internationally leading architectural firms involved in the design of famous buildings and bridges in other big cities. Examples include OMA (Rem Koolhaas), MVRDV, Neutelings & Riedijk and Erick van Egeraat. It has the reputation in being a platform for architectural development and education through the NAi (Netherlands Architecture Institute), which is open to the public and has a variety of exhibitions on architecture and urban planning issues and prior the Berlage Institute, a postgraduate laboratory of architecture. The city has 38 skyscrapers and 352 high-rises and has many skyscrapers planned or under construction. The top 5 of highest buildings in the Netherlands consists entirely of buildings in Rotterdam. It is home to the tallest building in the Netherlands, the Maastoren with a height of 165 meters. In 2021, the Zalmhaven Tower is completed with a height of 215 meters, and is now the new tallest building in the Netherlands.

History
In the first decades of the 20th century, some influential architecture in the modern style was built in Rotterdam. Notable are the Van Nelle fabriek (1929) a monument of modern factory design by Brinkman en Van der Vlugt, the Jugendstil clubhouse of the Royal Maas Yacht Club designed by Hooijkaas jr. en Brinkman (1909), and Feyenoord's football stadium De Kuip (1936) also by Brinkman en Van der Vlugt. The architect J. J. P. Oud was a famous Rotterdammer in those days. The Van Nelle Factory obtained the status of UNESCO World Heritage Site in 2014.
During the early stages of World War II the centre of Rotterdam was bombed by the German Luftwaffe, destroying many of the older buildings in the centre of the city. After an initial crisis re-construction, the centre of Rotterdam has become the site of the ambitious new architecture.

Rotterdam is also famous for its Lijnbaan 1952 by architects Broek en Bakema, Peperklip by architect Carel Weeber, Kubuswoningen or cube houses designed by architect Piet Blom 1984.

The newest landmark in Rotterdam is the Markthal, designed by architect firm MVRDV. In addition to that, there are many international well-known architects based in Rotterdam like O.M.A (Rem Koolhaas), Neutelings & Riedijk and Erick van Egeraat to name a few. Two architectural landmarks are located in the Lloydkwartier: the STC college building and the Schiecentrale 4b. The construction of the Depot of the Museum Boijmans Van Beuningen was started in 2003 and was officially opened by king Willem-Alexander on 5 November 2021. It is the world's first fully accessible art depot.

Rotterdam also houses several of the tallest structures in the Netherlands.
 The Erasmusbrug (1996) is a 790-meter (2,600 ft) cable-stayed bridge linking the north and south of Rotterdam.
 Rotterdam has the tallest residential building in the Netherlands: the De Zalmhaven Tower.
 Rotterdam is also home to the tallest office building 'Maastoren' which houses Deloitte. This office tower surpassed the 'Delftse Poort' which houses Nationale-Nederlanden insurance company, part of ING Group as tallest office tower in 2009.

Rotterdam has a reputation for being a platform for architectural development and education through the Berlage Institute, a postgraduate laboratory of architecture, and the NAi (Netherlands Architecture Institute), which is open to the public and has a variety of exhibitions on architecture and urban planning issues.

Over 30 new highrise projects are being developed. A Guardian journalist wrote in 2013 that "All this is the consequence of the city suffering a bombardment of two things: bombs and architects."

Sports
Rotterdam calls itself Sportstad (City of Sports). The city annually organises several world-renowned sporting events. Some examples are the Rotterdam Marathon, the World Port Tournament, and the Rotterdam World Tennis Tournament. Rotterdam also organises one race of the Red Bull Air Race World Championship and the car racing event Monaco aan de Maas (Monaco at the Meuse).

The city is also the home of many sports clubs and some historic and iconic athletes.

Football

Rotterdam is the home of three professional football clubs, being first tier clubs Feyenoord, Sparta and Excelsior.

Feyenoord, founded in 1908 and the dominant of the three professional clubs, has won fifteen national titles since the introduction of professional football in the Netherlands. It won the Champions league as the first Dutch club in 1970 and won the World Cup for club teams in the same year. In 1974, they were the first Dutch club to win the UEFA Cup and in 2002, Feyenoord won the UEFA Cup again. In 2008, the year of their 100-year-anniversary, Feyenoord won the KNVB-cup.

Seating 51,480, its 1937 stadium, called Stadion Feijenoord but popularly known as De Kuip ('the Tub'), is the second-largest in the country, after the Amsterdam Arena. De Kuip, located in the southeast of the city, has hosted many international football games, including the final of Euro 2000 and has been awarded a FIFA 5 star ranking. There are concrete plans to build a new stadium with a capacity of at least 63,000 seats.

Sparta, founded in 1888 and situated in the northwest of Rotterdam, won the national title six times; Excelsior (founded 1902), in the northeast, has never won any.

Rotterdam also has three fourth tier clubs, SC Feijenoord (Feyenoord Amateurs), PVV DOTO and TOGR.
Rotterdam is and has been the home to many great football players and coaches, among whom:

Marathon

Rotterdam has its own annual international marathon, which offers one of the fastest courses in the world. From 1985 until 1998, the world record was set in Rotterdam, first by Carlos Lopes and later in 1988 by Belayneh Densamo.

In 1998, the world record for women was set by Tegla Loroupe, in a time of 2:20.47. Loroupe won the Rotterdam Marathon three consecutive times, from 1997 to 1999.

The track record for men is held by Bashir Abdi, who ran a time of 2:03.36 in 2021. The female record was set in 2012 when Tiki Gelana finished the race in 2:18.58. Gelana went on to become the 2012 Olympic champion in London, a few months later.

The marathon starts and ends on the Coolsingel in the heart of Rotterdam. It attracts a total of 900.000 visitors.

Tennis

Since 1972, Rotterdam hosts the indoor hard court ABN AMRO World Tennis Tournament, part of the ATP Tour. The event was first organised in 1972 when it was won by Arthur Ashe. Ashe went on to win the tournament two more times, making him the singles title record holder.

Former Wimbledon winner Richard Krajicek became the tournament director after his retirement in 2000. The latest edition of the tournament attracted a total of 116.354 visitors.

Tour de France
In November 2008 Rotterdam was chosen as the host of the Grand Départ of the 2010 Tour de France.
Rotterdam won the selection over the Dutch city of Utrecht. Germany's Düsseldorf had previously also expressed interest in hosting. The Amaury Sport Organization (ASO), the organizer of the Tour de France, said in a statement on its web site that it chose Rotterdam because, in addition to it being another big city, like London, to showcase the use of bikes for urban transportation, it provided a location well-positioned considering the rest of the route envisioned for the 2010 event.

The start in Rotterdam was the fifth in the Netherlands. The prologue was a  individual time trial crossing the centre of the city. The first regular stage left the Erasmusbrug and went south, towards Brussels.

The second stage of 2015 edition took the riders through Rotterdam on their way to Neeltje Jans in Zeeland.

Rowing
Members of the student rowing club Skadi were part of the 'Holland Acht', winning a gold medal at the Olympics in 1996. Since the opening in April 2013, Rotterdam hosts the rowing venue Willem-Alexander Baan that hosted the 2016 World Rowing Championships for Seniors, U23 and Juniors.

Field hockey
In field hockey, Rotterdam has the largest hockey club in the Netherlands, HC Rotterdam, with its own stadium in the north of the city and nearly 2,400 members. The first men's and women's teams both play on the highest level in the Dutch Hoofdklasse.

Baseball
Rotterdam is home to the most successful European baseball team, Neptunus Rotterdam, winning the most European Cups.

Boxing

Rotterdam has a long boxing tradition starting with Bep van Klaveren (1907–1992), aka 'The Dutch Windmill', Gold medal winner of the 1928 Amsterdam Olympics, followed by professional boxers like Regilio Tuur and Don Diego Poeder.

Swimming
Rotterdam's swimming tradition started with Marie Braun aka Zus (sister) Braun, who was coached to a gold medal at the 1928 Amsterdam Olympics by her mother Ma Braun, and 3 European titles 3 years later in Paris. In her career as 14-time national champ, she broke 6 world records. Ma Braun later also coached the Rotterdam-born, three-times Olympic champion Rie Mastenbroek during the Berlin Olympics in 1936. In later years Inge de Bruijn became a Rotterdam sports icon as triple Olympic Gold medal winner in 2000 and triple European Gold medal winner in 2001.

Sailing
Olympic Gold medalist, in the O-Jolle during 1936 Olympics, Daan Kagchelland was born in Rotterdam and member of the Rotterdamsche Zeil Vereeniging. The Kralingse plas was and is still a source of Olympic sailors like Koos de Jong, Ben Verhagen, Henny Vegter, Serge Kats and Margriet Matthijsse.

Motorcycle racing
Motorcycle speedway was staged in the Feyenoord Stadium after the second world war. The team which raced in a Dutch league was known as the Feyenoord Tigers. The team included Dutch riders and some English and Australian riders.

Sportsmen of the year election
Since 1986, the city has selected its best sportsman, woman and team at the Rotterdam Sports Awards Election, held in December.

Other famous Rotterdam athletes

Mia Audina, a retired Indonesia-born badminton player, living in Rotterdam.
Nelli Cooman, a Surinamese-born retired athlete who held the 60 m dash world record, and was the world and European champion in that event.
Robert Doornbos, a Rotterdam-born race car driver, who competed in the Formula One.
Robert Eenhoorn, a Rotterdam-born retired MLB shortstop, who competed for the New York Yankees, the Anaheim Angels and the New York Mets.
Dex Elmont, a Rotterdam-born judoka, who finished second in the European championships in 2009 in the  division.
Guillaume Elmont, a Rotterdam-born judoka, who became world champion in 2005 in the  division.
Francisco Elson, a Rotterdam-born basketball player who played in the NBA, won the NBA finals in 2007 with the San Antonio Spurs.
Gaisah is a multiple medal winner in several international events, both as a citizen of Ghana and the Netherlands.
Francis Hoenselaar, a Rotterdam-born female darts player, generally recognised as the best Dutch female darts player ever.
Robert Lathouwers, an athlete born in a Rotterdam suburb, specialised in the 800 m. Lathouwers gained international notoriety when he got disqualified after shoving Irish athlete David McCarthy in the 2010 European Championships.
Fatima Moreira de Melo, a Rotterdam-born, three-times Olympic champion in field hockey. Moreira de Melo is a professional poker player.
Piet Roozenburg, a Rotterdam-born draughts player, who was the world champion from 1948 to 1956 and the 8-time Dutch champion.
Betty Stöve, a Rotterdam-born retired female tennis double specialist and 10-time Grand Slam winner.
Ingmar Vos, a Rotterdam-born decathlete, with a personal best of 8224 points.

Yearly events
Rotterdam hosts several annual events unique to the city. It hosts the Zomercarnaval (Summer carnaval), the second-largest Caribbean carnival in Europe, originally called the Antillean carnival. Other events include: North Sea Jazz Festival, the largest Jazz festival in Europe, and a three-day long maritime extravaganza called the World Port Days celebrating the Port of Rotterdam.

 January: 'Zesdaagse van Rotterdam' – Rotterdam Ahoy
 January: International Film Festival Rotterdam
 February: 
Rotterdam Open ABN AMRO ATP 500 Tennis Tournament – Rotterdam Ahoy
 Art Rotterdam - international art fair at Van Nellefabriek
 April–June:
Rotterdam Marathon
Poetry International
Koningsdag Festival (27 April)
 CHIO (Concours Hippique International Officiel) Rotterdam
 Roparun
 July:
North Sea Jazz Festival (second weekend of July)
Summer Carnival
 August:
Pleinbioscoop
Dag van de Romantische Muziek (Romantic music festival)
 September:
 The World Port Days
 November/December (Last weekend before 5 December (Sinterklaas))
Boterletterwedstrijden (Sailing regatta for International classes)

Transportation
Rotterdam offers connections by international, national, regional and local public transport systems, as well as by the Dutch motorway network.

Motorways
There are several motorways to/from Rotterdam. The following four are part of its 'Ring' (ring road):
A20 (Ring North): Hook of Holland – Rotterdam – Gouda
A16 (Ring East): Rotterdam – Breda (- Antwerp – Paris)
A15 (Ring South): Europoort – Rotterdam – Nijmegen
A4 (Ring West). Rotterdam - The Hague (- Amsterdam)
The following two other motorways also serve Rotterdam:
A13, (Amsterdam -) The Hague – Delft – Rotterdam
A29, (Antwerp -) Bergen op Zoom – Rotterdam

Airport
Much smaller than the international hub Schiphol Airport, Rotterdam The Hague Airport (formerly known as Zestienhoven) is the third-largest airport in the country, behind Schiphol Airport and Eindhoven Airport. Located north of the city, it has shown solid growth over the past five years, mostly caused by the growth of the low-cost carrier market. For business travellers, Rotterdam The Hague Airport offers advantages in terms of rapid handling of passengers and baggage. Environmental regulations make further growth uncertain.

Train

Rotterdam is well connected to the Dutch railway network, and has several international connections:

 Southern direction Dordrecht, Breda, Eindhoven, Flushing (Vlissingen) (also international trains to Belgium/France)
 Western direction Hook of Holland (reopened as a metro line in 2019)
 North-Western direction The Hague, Leiden, Amsterdam
 Northern direction (high-speed rail) Schiphol, Amsterdam
 North-Eastern direction Utrecht and further
 A fifth alternative train system to the Hague, the Hofplein Line was converted to the light rail system Randstadrail in 2006.
 The city is often mentioned as the terminus of the Eurasian Land Bridge.

Railway stations
Rotterdam Centraal – Rotterdam's main station
Rotterdam Alexander – Eastern part of Rotterdam
Rotterdam Blaak – Close to the centre of Rotterdam
Rotterdam Lombardijen – Most Southern part of Rotterdam
Rotterdam Noord – Northern part of Rotterdam
Rotterdam Zuid – Northern part of the Southern part of Rotterdam
Rotterdam Stadion – A station near the Feyenoord stadium, open in connection with football matches and music concerts

The main connections:
 Direct international services to Belgium and France via high-speed train system: Thalys
 International trains to the south of France and London via the Eurostar
Frequent international trains to Antwerp and Brussels, Belgium
 Frequent services within the Netherlands:
 Intercity line to The Hague, Leiden, Schiphol airport and Amsterdam (north)
 Intercity line to Utrecht and on to Deventer or Enschede (the east), Leeuwarden (north-west) or Groningen (north-east)
 Intercity line to Dordrecht, Roosendaal and on to Vlissingen (south west)
 Intercity line to Dordrecht, Breda, Tilburg, Eindhoven and Venlo (south east)
 Night services every hour connecting every day of the week to Delft, The Hague, Leiden, Schiphol airport, Amsterdam, and, with a detour, Utrecht. On Thursday, Friday and Saturday night services (either directly or via a detour) to Den Bosch, Eindhoven, Tilburg, Roosendaal.
 Several semi-fast services and local trains originate or call at Rotterdam Centraal; semi-fast services Amsterdam-Breda.
 Detailed information available from the site of the Nederlandse Spoorwegen (Dutch Railways)

In Rotterdam, public transport services are provided by the following companies:
 NS (Dutch Railways): national train services
 RET (Rotterdamse Elektrische Tram): Tram, city-bus, metro, randstadrail and ferry-services in Rotterdam and surrounding cities
 Arriva Netherlands: regional bus services
 Connexxion: regional bus services
 Qbuzz: regional bus services
 Veolia: regional bus services.

Metro

In 1968, Rotterdam was the first Dutch city to open a metro system. The metro system consists of three main lines, each of which has its own variants. The metro network has  of rail tracks, and there are 70 stations, which makes it the biggest of the Benelux. 5 lines operate the system; 3 lines (A, B and C) on the east–west line, and two (D and E) on the north–south line. Line E (Randstadrail) connects Rotterdam with The Hague as of December 2011.

Tram

Service
Tramlines in Rotterdam :
 2: (Rotterdam) Charlois – Rotterdam Lombardijen NS – (Rotterdam) Keizerswaard (runs only to the southern part of the city)
 4: (Rotterdam) Molenlaan – Rotterdam Centraal – (Rotterdam) Marconiplein
 7: (Rotterdam) Oostplein – Rotterdam Centraal – (Rotterdam) Willemsplein
 8: (Rotterdam) Spangen – Rotterdam Centraal – (Rotterdam) Kleiweg
 20: Rotterdam Centraal – Rotterdam Lombardijen NS – (Rotterdam) Lombardijen
 21: (Schiedam) Woudhoek – Station Schiedam Centrum – Rotterdam Centraal – (Rotterdam) De Esch
 23: (Rotterdam) Marconiplein – Rotterdam Centraal – (Rotterdam) Beverwaard
 24: (Vlaardingen) Holy – Station Schiedam Centrum – Rotterdam Centraal – (Rotterdam) De Esch
 25: (Rotterdam) Schiebroek – Rotterdam Centraal – (Barendrecht) Carnisselande

Special tram lines:
 10: Historical tram line, only runs in summer and throughout the whole city for tourist information. Using historical Rotterdam Trams from the year 1931.
 18: Tramline from Rotterdam Central Station towards Park, runs only at the Dunya Festival and during the Rotterdam World Port Days.
 12: Rotterdam Centraal – Stadion Feyenoord or Rotterdam Centraal – Het Kasteel ('The Castle', Sparta Stadium). Football tramline, only for big fixtures at Stadion Feyenoord or Het Kasteel.
 Snert-tram: Historical tram, only in winter as a tourist tram through Rotterdam. Passengers are provided with a cup of "snert"; Rotterdam dialect for erwtensoep (pea soup). Rolling stock is a historical Rotterdam tram from 1968.
 IJsjes-tram: Summer version of the snert tram, providing tourists with ice cream rather than pea soup.

Bus

RET runs buses in the city of Rotterdam and surrounding places like Barendrecht, Ridderkerk, Rhoon, Poortugaal, Schiedam, Vlaardingen, Delft and Capelle aan den IJssel.

Arriva Netherlands, Connexxion, Qbuzz and Veolia run buses from other cities to Rotterdam.

An automated bus service, ParkShuttle, runs between Kralingse Zoom metro station and the Rivium Business Park in Capelle aan den IJssel.

The RoMeO Foundation
The Foundation RoMeO (Rotterdam Public Transport Museum and Exploitation of Oldtimers) was founded in 1997 to bring together various historical transport collections into one collection. Currently, the joint collection consists of more than sixty trams, twenty buses and an underground metro dating from 1967. Since 2010 the Rotterdam public transport museum is housed in the monumental tram depot Hillegersberg from 1923.

Waterbus
The Waterbus network consists of seven lines. The mainline (Line 20) stretches from Rotterdam to Dordrecht. The ferry carries about 130 passengers, and there is space for 60 bicycles. The stops between Rotterdam and Dordrecht are:
 Rotterdam Erasmusbrug – Krimpen aan den IJssel Stormpolder – Ridderkerk De Schans – Alblasserdam Kade – Hendrik-Ido-Ambacht Noordeinde – Papendrecht Westeind – Dordrecht Merwekade.

Ferry
P&O Ferries have daily sailings from Europoort to Kingston upon Hull in the UK.

International relations

The town of Rotterdam was founded in 1661 by Dutch settlers, who named it after the city of Rotterdam in the Netherlands, where many immigrants last touched European grounds. The town borders the city of Schenectady. Founded as a 'first class town' in 1942, Rotterdam has since adopted the Old World Rotterdam coat of arms along with the motto Sterker door Strijd (Stronger through Effort).

Rotterdam has city and port connections throughout the world. In 2008, the city had 13 sister cities, 12 partner cities, and 4 sister ports. Since 2008, the City of Rotterdam doesn't forge new sister or partner connections. Sister and partner cities are not a priority in international relations.

On 15 March 2017, the Turkish president expressed his wish that Istanbul should no longer be the twin town of Rotterdam. A speaker of the Rotterdam municipality then explained that the two cities have no official partnership. Both authorities do cooperate often.

Twin towns – Sister cities
Rotterdam is twinned with:

  Baltimore (since 1985)
  Burgas (since 1976)
  Cologne (since 1958)
  Constanța (since 1976)
  Dresden (since 1988)
  Esch-sur-Alzette (since 1958)
  Gdańsk (since 1977)
  Havana (since 1983)
  Lille (since 1958)
  Liège (since 1958)
  Shanghai (since 1979)
  Saint Petersburg (since 1984)
  Turin (since 1958)
  Şanlıurfa (since 2023)

Partner cities

  Antwerp (since 1940)
  Basel (since 1945)
  Bratislava (since 1991)
  Budapest (since 1991)
  Duisburg (since 1950)
  Durban (since 1991)
  Hull (since 1936)
  Jakarta (since 1983)
  Nuremberg (since 1961)
  Osaka Prefecture (since 1984)
  Oslo (since 1945)
  Prague (since 1991)

Sister ports
  Kobe (since 1967)
  Busan (since 1987)
  Seattle (since 1969)
  Tokyo (since 1989)

Places named after Rotterdam
  Nieuw Rotterdam, Nickerie District, Suriname (1866-1875)
  Rotterdam, New York, United States
  Rotterdam, Limpopo, South Africa

Notable residents

 Pierre Bayle (1647–1706), enlightenment philosopher.
 Leo Beenhakker (born 1942), football coach.
 Giovanni van Bronckhorst (born 1975), former footballer with Feyenoord.
 Jules Deelder (1944–2019), poet, writer, DJ, night mayor.
 Desiderius Erasmus (1466–1536), philosopher and humanist.
 Pim Fortuyn (1948–2002), assassinated politician.
 Leo Fuld (1912–1997), singer.
 Piet Pieterszoon Hein (1577–1629), naval fleet officer and privateer.
 Jacobus Henricus van 't Hoff (1852–1911), Dutch physical chemist, first winner of the Nobel Prize in Chemistry.
 Rem Koolhaas (born 1944), internationally renowned architect.
 Willem de Kooning (1904–1997), painter.
 Bernard Mandeville (1670–1733), philosopher, political economist and satirist.
 Mary Louisa Molesworth (1839–1921), an English writer of children's stories.
 Coen Moulijn (1937–2011), football player of Feyenoord.
 Johan van Oldebarnevelt (1547–1619), statesman of the Dutch Revolt.
 Jan Jacob van Oosterzee (1817–1882), a Dutch divine.
 Colonel Tom Parker (1909–1997), manager of Elvis Presley.
 Robin van Persie (born 1983), Feyenoord forward and Dutch international footballer.
 James Scott, 1st Duke of Monmouth (1649–1685), English nobleman and military officer.
 Marten Toonder (1912–2005), comic writer.
 Maarten Tromp (1598–1653) & Cornelis Tromp (1629–1691), Dutch admirals. 
 Angela Visser (born 1966), model, actress, Miss Holland 1988 and Miss Universe 1989.

In popular culture

Rotterdam features in Edgar Allan Poe's short story "The Unparalleled Adventure of One Hans Pfaall" (1835).

Rotterdam features in J.T. Sheridan Le Fanu's "Strange Event in the Life of Schalken the Painter" (1839).

In season 1, episode 2 of The Golden Girls ("Guess Who's Coming to the Wedding?"), Dorothy reminisces how her ex-husband, Stan, would buy her tulips after they fought. "Towards the end, our house looked like Easter in Rotterdam."

In 1996, the British band The Beautiful South recorded a song named after this region titled "Rotterdam (or Anywhere)."

Part of Jackie Chan's 1998 film Who Am I? is set in Rotterdam.

Ender's Shadow, part of the series Ender's Game is partially set in Rotterdam.

In the 2004 video game Hitman: Contracts, the missions "Rendezvous in Rotterdam" and "Deadly Cargo" are both set in Rotterdam.

The 2017 Laurence Olivier Award-winning play Rotterdam, written by Jon Brittain, is set in the city.

In Battlefield V, this city is used as a map released on its two of its maps on launch, which are Rotterdam and Devastation, and featured the British Army fighting against the Wehrmacht and according to its history, the white building was almost left untouched by the bombing during WWII and that building can be seen on both in-game and real world.

See also
 World's busiest ports, by type of port (a "list of lists")

References

Footnotes

Notes

Bibliography

External links

 Rotterdam City Council (English)
 Rotterdam Tourism Board
 VisitRotterdam.org (Unofficial)

 
Cities in the Netherlands
Municipalities of South Holland
1340 establishments in Europe
Populated places in South Holland
Port cities and towns in the Netherlands
Port cities and towns of the North Sea